Mitchell Wesley Melton (April 6, 1943 – March 11, 2013) was a former Democratic member of the Pennsylvania House of Representatives. He was the founder, organizer and original spokesman of the Pennsylvania Legislative Black Caucus, founded in 1969.

Melton died after a short battle with prostate cancer on March 11, 2013.

Legislative work
Melton authored and sponsored House Bill No. 126, Printers No. 137, now Act No. 305. The bill provides for a period of Silent Prayer and Meditation, in each public school classroom, at the beginning of each school day, for those who are so disposed. This Bill became law in Pennsylvania, on December 6, 1972.

He also authored and sponsored House Bill No. 79, Printers No. 1479 now Act No. 57, which provides that any Pennsylvania motorist, who has been found guilty of an infraction of the motor vehicle code, and is sentenced to pay a fine and costs of prosecution, shall be given seven full days from the date of conviction, to pay such fine and costs before they can be imprisoned. This Bill became Law on July 29, 1971.

He was the founder, organizer and original spokesman of the Pennsylvania Legislative Black Caucus, founded in 1969.

References

External links
https://web.archive.org/web/20130421060804/http://mitchmelton.net/

Politicians from Philadelphia
Democratic Party members of the Pennsylvania House of Representatives
2013 deaths
1943 births
Deaths from cancer in Pennsylvania